Pedro Diz (born 15 July 1944) is an Argentine former backstroke swimmer. He competed at the 1960 Summer Olympics and the 1964 Summer Olympics.

References

External links
 

1944 births
Living people
Argentine male backstroke swimmers
Olympic swimmers of Argentina
Swimmers at the 1960 Summer Olympics
Swimmers at the 1964 Summer Olympics
Sportspeople from Santa Fe, Argentina
20th-century Argentine people
21st-century Argentine people